Lady Rhea has been a Wiccan high priestess in the Gardnerian tradition since 1973, and since 1982 runs an occult shop in New York, with Lady Miw (aka Carol Bulzone).  In 1992, she opened Magickal Realms (Enchanted Candle Shoppe Inc.) in Greenwich Village, later relocating to The Bronx, where she co-operates the shop with Lady Zoradia.

Lady Rhea, who is openly lesbian, supported the Minoan Brotherhood with Lord Gwyddion (aka Edmund Buczynski), and later co-founded the Minoan Sisterhood with Lady Miw. On the Magickal Realms website, Rhea states that she is "of the Gardnerian and Welsh Tradition but considers herself and all of her children as Edwardians from her High Priest and teacher Edmund Buczynski (Lord Gwyddion)." Her children—that is, Wiccans who have studied under her and been initiated into the craft—include Lexa Roséan.

Throughout her career, she has mentored and educated New Yorkers on witchcraft and occult practices spanning multiple generations. A permanent fixture in New York culture, Lady Rhea continues to hold an iconic position concerning both magick activism and witchcraft.

Early life 
Born with the name Aurelia Bila, she was reared in the Bronx. Raised in an Italian and Catholic home, her family regularly attended Sunday service. Her interest in witchcraft is said to have started when she first saw Fantasia at five years old. Throughout her childhood, she attended public school until the ninth grade where she transferred to a beauty high school located on the Grand Concourse. Upon entering beauty high school, she found herself shopping in the area at local botanicas. This is where she was initially introduced to Afro-Caribbean beliefs such as Santeria. Santeria is a religion that sprouts from Yoruba beliefs and includes Catholic practices. This compounding of her Catholic background and exposure to Santeria began her journey into the occult. Upon receiving a book from a friend titled The Gypsy Witch Fortune Teller, Lady Reah experienced an awakening that drove her further into training in search of a crystal ball.

This search for a crystal ball led to her arrival at the store called Warlock Shoppe, which introduced her to Herman Slater in 1972. Slater would eventually employ Rhea at his store, Magickal Childe, in Manhattan and serve as a mentor. While working, she waited on customers, weighed herbs, and shared knowledge about "The Craft." This location became the epicenter of occult culture and practice in New York. While working at this store, Lady Rhea would have the opportunity to meet key figures such as Eddie Buczynski, the founder of Welsh Traditionalist Witchcraft and the Minoan Brotherhood.

Work with Minoan Brotherhood 
Training alongside Buczynski, Lady Rhea came to understand and practice Welsh tradition. Aiding in the formation of the Minoan Brotherhood starting in 1977, they both sought to allow same-sex couples the opportunity to equally participate in rituals. Despite the Minoan Brotherhood being exclusively male, there was still an underlying emphasis on gender equality. Aspects of this belief are highlighted by marking the tradition's primary deity as Cretan Snake Goddess, Rhea. Soon after Lady Rhea's establishment as high priestess, her then-husband Ammund also became initiated. Those still active in WICA and the Minoan Brotherhood can trace their lineage back to either Lady Rhea or Buczynski.

After the passing of Lady Rhea's partner, Eddie Buczynski, she laid the ground rule that individuals initiated into the brotherhood would refer to themselves as an "Edwardian Wiccan" as a gesture of honor for his work.

In 1978, Lady Rhea joined the Minoan Sisterhood with Carol Bulzone (Lady Miw), a group started by Buczynski.

Career

Enchanted Candles 
While working at Magickal Childe in 1979, Lady Rhea began her first adventure into entrepreneurship through a product called "The Enchanted Candle." Beginning by selling at Magickal Childe, she eventually sold them at her own stores, Enchantments and Magickal Realms, starting in 1982. This product is a tall, cylindrical candle that contains magickally hand carved seals, exotic oils for scent, and glitter designs. Burning for up to seven days, consumers may place an intention upon the candle and allegedly experience results. Intentions such as "uncrossing, healing, weight loss, love drawing, and fast luck" are included as purposes. On Lady Rhea's website, customers can choose from candles focused in a breadth of different areas such as love, finance, blessing, energy, and motivation. She would later publish a book titled The Enchanted Candle, revealing the process behind creating them and their ingredients. This product soon became a popular cult fixture in the New York occult scene.

Shops 
Starting in 1982, Lady Rhea opened a store called Enchantments with her partner, Carole Bulzone. This was located on 9th street in the East Village of Manhattan. Lady Rhea stated in an interview that she "wanted to bring more of the craft to the public" but the driving factor to open the store was "in dedication to the gods (3:42)." By 1987, she sold her half in Enchantments in order to focus on her children.

In the years after leaving Enchantments, Lady Rhea relied on her publication and consultation job with Original Products, one of the largest Botanicas in the world. During this experience, she was able to dive into studies on Santeria. In 1992, she decided to leave Original Products for other pursuits.

But, that was not the end of her entrepreneurial career. Lady Rhea opened Magickal Realms in 1992, initially located in Greenwich Village, before relocating to the Bronx in 1995. This store sells a variety of oddities related to sympathetic magic. A collection of items resembling a museum are carried in her store such as candles, incense, exotic oils, and herbs just to name a few. Today, Magickal Realms is one of the largest botanica shops in the world.

Tarot card readings 
Her interest in tarot card readings began when she was 12 after playing with an ouija board for divination. At the time, there were few professional tarot card readers in New York and Lady Rhea yearned to bring more representation forward. In 1966, she wandered into the Bronx Village Shop, a small store on Kingsbridge Road. The owner, who went by the name "Chinky" was a small Nuyorican woman who quickly became fast friends with Lady Rhea. Chinky was the first person to teach her how to read Spanish Tarot Cards. After Chinky's training, Lady Rhea read cards for Bronx Village Shop customers. Ever since then, she regularly performs tarot card reading out of her shop, Magickal Realms. Customers report asking for foresight on love, finances, and career amongst other topics.

Community contributions 
In addition to her entrepreneurial impact on New York, Lady Rhea incorporates community activism to raise awareness of witchcraft. As the founder of the annual Witch Pride Parade in New York, she fights for acceptance of pagan or occult practices in society. Lady Rhea says "Witch Pride Parade isn't because I need rights. The Witch Pride Parade is because people need to understand we're not demonologists. We're not satanists. We're not anti anything. We are earth worshipers. We want to worship our old gods without people going to persecution." This concept of raising awareness is intersected with a goal of bringing different religious backgrounds together under one event. This effort to work in solidarity with other religions highlights her desire to destigmatize paganism along with others.

Lady Rhea acknowledges evangelical protestors at the parades, with the perception that "they have a right to their beliefs, but don't step on somebody else's."

Alongside her work for The Witch Pride Parade, she also mentors the next generation of witches. She urges young individuals who are interested to seek out opportunities for information such as events, books, and shops.

Beliefs and practices 
Her first introduction into paganism and witchcraft started with Santeria. This hybrid of paganism and Catholicism allowed her to further explore Minoan and Wicca.

Lady Rhea received her name based on the Rhea, the Great Mother Goddess who watched over the Minoan pantheon. The Great Mother Goddess is attributed as the creator of the Milky Way in Minoan practice. Minoan deities were passed on by later Greeks. Homer and Diodorus Siculus notably mention Minoan deities in their writing and inform much of the modern understanding of their practices. Legend describes Mount Ida (Crete) as Rhea's sacred place, where she birthed her son, Zeus, in order to hide him from his father, Cronos. Though later writers describe Rhea as a fertility goddess, Minoan belief would push back against this ideal. Rather, Minoans perceived Rhea as a focus of the land itself, referring to the land and earth sacred as a living thing. This concept of Rhea as a source of life through earth defines the general beliefs of Minoans. Similarly rejecting ideas of dispensation where resources can be bought and sold.

"Lady Rhea's own spiritual journey can be described as eclectic; in addition to witchcraft, she has initiations in Tibetan Buddhism, is a devotee of Santa Muerte and works with a large pantheon of deities, including Hindu, as well as the Orishas." She describes it as "religion based on ecology, its preserving mother earth." This wide breadth of devotions is further reflected in her shop Magickal Realms.

While she practices Wiccan and bases much of her training on sympathetic magic, she rejects sacrifices. Referring to the movie The Wicker Man, Lady Rhea points out that witches receive a bad rap from Hollywood through misleading representation and references to the devil or Satan's mistress.

Today, she views witchcraft as being in a modern renaissance. Where astrology and modern understandings of Wiccan combined with other pagan religions can bring in younger generations to practice.

Published work

The Enchanted Candle 
In 2004, Lady Rhea published her book The Enchanted Candle, based on the hand-carved, embellished candles she has made for years. Within this publication, Lady Rhea details rituals associated with a breadth of topics and provides informational steps on how to perform these. This know-how is coupled with explanations for why these rituals work and what to expect to achieve. Within this 304 page book, she includes her preferred candles, herbs, and oils along with how to obtain these items. In 2016, she released an expanded version of the 2004 publication.

The Enchanted Formulary: Blending Magickal Oils for Love, Prosperity and Healing 
She published a second book, The Enchanted Formulary: Blending Magickal Oils for Love, Prosperity, and Healing, in September 2006. This book details the blends, fragrances, and oil related to Wicca practices. These allow readers to practice their own spells, candle magick, anointed sacred objects, mojo bags, ritual bathing, and incense. Lady Rhea spills all the secrets and recipes she has collected over thirty years of training.
Included in the book outside of recipes is details on technique, readers can expect to learn mixology and magickal application skills that reinforce understanding of astrology. Lady Rhea alleges that applications of these recipes or practices can lead to finding love, luck, and success.

Handfasted and Heartjoined 
Published in 2001, Lady Rhea's book Handfasted and Heartjoined, details the traditional wedding rituals of handfasting. With the rise in Wicca, Witchcraft, and Paganism, Rhea felt there was a need to reignite traditional knowledge about the ritual of handfasting. Handfasting is the act of tying the hands of two partners together to symbolize the binding of two lives. By offering information on how to conduct a handfasting ceremony, empowering a new family, and dealing with non-pagan friends/relatives, Lady Rhea successfully lays out the process and relationships that go along.

Bibliography 
The Enchanted Candle (2004) 
The Enchanted Formulary (2006)

References

External links 
Magickal Realms website

American businesspeople in retailing
American occultists
American women in business
Gardnerian Wiccans
American lesbian writers
American LGBT businesspeople
Living people
People from the Bronx
American Wiccans
Wiccan priestesses
Year of birth missing (living people)
LGBT Wiccans
21st-century American women writers